Theratpally is a village in Nalgonda district  in the state of Telangana, India.

Geography

Demographics
 India census, Theratpally had a population of -,---. Males constitute 50% of the population and females 50%. Theratpally has an average literacy rate of 62%, higher than the national average of 59.5%; with male literacy of 73% and female literacy of 51%. 14% of the population is under 6 years of age.

Industries
Agriculture is the major source of income to people living in and around Theratpally.

Temples
Theratpally has got culture rich temples.
PEDDAMMA GUTTA (there are nine temples in one place only)
peddamma temple
Chennakeshava Temple
Vishnu Temple (old temple)
Birappa Temple
Hanuman Temple
saai bba Temple
Mallikarjuna swamy Temple
Godadevi temple
Ganesh temple

VILLAGE TEMPLES:
 Chakali Rajaka Madivala Manchideva Temple in west Rajaka youth
 Markondaiah Temple,
  Shivalayam 
 Kaatamaya Temple

Schools & Colleges in Theratpally
 Government Primary School

Cinema Theaters
There are no theaters

References

Villages in Nalgonda district